The 2016 West Oxfordshire District Council election was held on 5 May 2016 to elect members of West Oxfordshire District Council in England. This was on the same day as other local elections.

Elections were held for 17 of the 49 seats on the council. No seats changed hands. The Conservative Party held 12 seats, the Labour Party held three seats and the Liberal Democrats held two seats. The Conservatives remained in overall control of the council with a total of 41 seats. The Labour Party and Liberal Democrats remained in opposition with four seats each.

Ward results

Chadlington and Churchill

Charlbury and Finstock

Chipping Norton

Eynsham and Cassington

Freeland and Hanborough

Hailey, Minster Lovell and Leafield

Kingham, Rollright and Enstone

Milton-Under-Wychwood

North Leigh

Standlake, Aston and Stanton Harcourt

Stonesfield and Tackley

Witney Central

Witney East

Witney North

Witney South

Witney West

Woodstock and Bladon

By-elections between 2016 and 2018

Hailey, Minster Lovell and Leafield by-election

The Bartons by-election

Carterton South by-election

References

2010s in Oxfordshire
2016 English local elections
2016